Tweedmouth is an area of the town of Berwick-upon-Tweed, Northumberland, England.

Tweedmouth may also refer to:

 Baron Tweedmouth, a title in the peerage of the United Kingdom
 Tweed mouth, a Scottish-English border estuary sometimes called a firth at the mouth of the River Tweed